Jeremy Roberts (born 24 November 1966), sometimes known as Jerry Roberts, is an English former footballer who made 38 appearances in the Football League playing as a goalkeeper for Hartlepool United, Leicester City, Darlington and Brentford in the 1980s. A former England youth international born in Middlesbrough, Roberts was on the books of Luton Town and Gillingham without representing either in the League, played in the League of Ireland for Waterford United, and played non-league football for clubs including Maidenhead United and Whitby Town.

References

External links
 Profile at brentfordfchistory.co.uk
 Hartlepool United profile at inthemadcrowd.co.uk

1966 births
Living people
Footballers from Middlesbrough
English footballers
England youth international footballers
Association football goalkeepers
Hartlepool United F.C. players
Leicester City F.C. players
Luton Town F.C. players
Waterford F.C. players
Darlington F.C. players
Brentford F.C. players
Maidenhead United F.C. players
Gillingham F.C. players
Whitby Town F.C. players
English Football League players
League of Ireland players